Seumas McNally (February 10, 1979 – March 21, 2000) was a Canadian video game programmer and designer. He is best known for indie games, notably DX-Ball and Tread Marks, which won the Grand Prize at the Independent Games Festival (IGF). The award was posthumously renamed in his honour when he died at age 21 of Hodgkin's lymphoma, shortly after having received the award himself.

Career 
McNally's first published video game was a side-scrolling helicopter shooter titled Tiger's Bane, programmed on the Amiga. Previously known as a demo by the name Flying Tigers, the game went live on November 11, 1997, published through Aminet. The same year, Seumas had also formed the software development company Longbow Digital Arts, as the president and lead programmer, working together with his father, Jim McNally (game designer), his mother, Wendy McNally (lead artist) and his brother, Philippe McNally (3D artist). The company followed up with the release of DX-Ball 2 in 1998, a sequel to the 1996 cult-classic PC game DX-Ball by Michael P. Welch, while simultaneously working on the 3D terrain tank racing game Tread Marks, which was released in 2000. The game is notable for featuring in-game deformable terrain and won three Independent Games Festival Awards for "Best Game", "Best Design" and "Best Programming". Other products McNally programmed include Particle Fire, a screensaver with great graphical effects; Texturizer, for creating wrapping textures; and WebProcessor, for creating fast HTML macros.

DX-Ball 
McNally, along with Michael P. Welch (creator of Pocket Tanks), developed DX-Ball, a freeware computer game for the PC first released in 1996. The game, originally based on an earlier series of Amiga games known as MegaBall, is patterned after classic ball-and-paddle arcade games such as Breakout and Arkanoid. DX-Ball has been succeeded by three direct follow-ups: DX-Ball 2 (1998), Rival Ball (2001) and Super DX-Ball (2004).

DX-Ball 2 
DX-Ball 2, by Longbow Games (follow up to DX-Ball), also introduces the feature of board-set selection, allowing the player to select between different sets of boards to play. The free demo thereby comes packed with a total of 24 boards divided into 6 board-sets of 4 boards search. Additional board packs can then be installed for more boards, whereas Board Pack 1 will expand the demo board-sets to 25 boards each, for a total of 150 boards. While a total of five board packs were released for the game, DX-Ball 2 was eventually succeeded by Rival Ball in 2001.

Illness and death 
McNally suffered from Hodgkin's lymphoma, an aggressive form of lung cancer, which he was diagnosed with in 1997 at the age of 18. McNally died on March 21, 2000, shortly after winning the grand prize for Tread Marks.

Legacy 
McNally's father continued to create a historical wargame, the basic design drafts of which he had helped to formulate. This was released in 2010 as Hegemony: Philip of Macedon and became the first entry in a series of historical wargames. Longbow Digital Arts, the independent game development company founded by McNally, continues operations until today. In 2018, it released a 20th Anniversary Edition of Seumas's cult classic computer game DX-Ball 2.

References

1979 births
Canadian video game designers
2000 deaths
Deaths from Hodgkin lymphoma
Deaths from cancer in Ontario